Nina Barnett (born 1983) is a South African artist currently living and working in New York City. She attended Witwatersrand University, Johannesburg.

Her work is concerned with investigating urban spaces and narratives in the form of stop motion animations, video installations, sound installations and interventions made in urban landscapes. Barnett's practice addresses transition, distance, and exploration, both horizontal and vertical.  Her past investigations also concern aspects of holes, mining, and depth through drawing, video, and sculpture. She has lived and worked in Johannesburg, Paris, and New York, and these experiences have a continual influence on her artwork. She often collaborates with Robyn Nesbitt.

References

1983 births
Living people
21st-century South African women artists
People from Johannesburg
University of the Witwatersrand alumni